Detective Story is a 1951 American crime drama directed by William Wyler and starring Kirk Douglas that tells the story of one day in the lives of the various people who populate a police detective squad. The ensemble supporting cast features Eleanor Parker, William Bendix, Cathy O'Donnell, and George Macready. Both Lee Grant and Joseph Wiseman play large roles in their film debuts. The film was adapted by Robert Wyler and Philip Yordan from the 1949 play of the same name by Sidney Kingsley. It was nominated for four Academy Awards, including Academy Award for Best Director for Wyler, Best Actress for Parker, and Best Supporting Actress for Grant.

An angry New York detective is one of a precinct of cops in a grim daily battle with the city's lowlife. Little does he realize that his obsessive pursuit of an "abortionist" is leading him to a discovery closer to home. The characters who pass through the precinct over the course of the day include a young petty embezzler, a pair of burglars, and a naive shoplifter.

Plot
The movie's events occur over a single night in the detective bullpen of a police station. Detective Jim McLeod (Kirk Douglas), whose violent criminal father drove his mother to insanity, nurtures a lifelong hatred of lawbreakers and is convinced that he has a flawless instinct for identifying criminals. He maintains a particular contempt for Dr. Karl Schneider (George Macready), who McLeod is convinced has performed illegal abortions that have resulted in patient deaths. McLeod has persuaded Schneider’s assistant (Gladys George) to implicate him in a police line-up. However, Schneider bribes her not to pick him out, infuriating McLeod.

Concurrently, several other cases are being processed in the bullpen. The detectives have arrested burglar Charley Gennini (Joseph Wiseman), who is revealed to be a psychopath with an extensive criminal record including murder and rape. McLeod also books a young man named Arthur Kindred (Craig Hill), who has admitted stealing money from his employer to try to impress the girl he loves. Although the employer is sympathetic and wants to drop charges after he is repaid, McLeod refuses to release the remorseful Kindred, saying that leniency only leads to more crime. Despite evidence of Kindred's kind nature, McLeod is unwilling to distinguish between a first time offender like Kindred and a dangerous repeat offender like Gennini.

McLeod misses another chance to establish Schneider’s guilt when a victim dies in hospital. Schneider boasts that he has sensitive knowledge about McLeod, who finally explodes in anger and brutally attacks him, requiring McLeod’s commanding officer Monaghan (Horace McMahon) to escort Schneider to the hospital in an ambulance. Schneider, half-conscious, mentions the name Giacoppetti, in connection with a woman supposedly linked with McLeod.

When Schneider’s lawyer Endicott Sims (Warner Anderson) arrives to protest the incident, he inadvertently lets slip that the woman Schneider was referring to is McLeod’s wife Mary (Eleanor Parker). Monaghan has Mary brought to the station and interviews her in private. She denies any connections until Monaghan invites in Giacoppetti (Gerald Mohr), who greets her by name.
  
The stricken Mary admits to her husband that years ago she had become pregnant by Giacoppetti. McLeod, who had been worried about her apparent infertility, cannot stomach the thought that it was caused by her abortion by Schneider, especially when Sims hints that there may have been more lovers. After McLeod accuses her of infidelity, Mary tells him he is cruel like his father was and leaves him. Suddenly, Gennini takes advantage of a distraction to steal an officer's revolver, and he fatally shoots McLeod before being disarmed. Dying, McLeod instructs his partner to release Kindred and to tell his wife he begs her forgiveness. The local paper praises McLeod for dying "in the line of duty".

Tying most of these events together is the presence of the "Shoplifter," who is ignored by the police as they do their jobs. Lee Grant, in her film debut, was nominated for Best Actress in a Supporting Role.

Cast

 Kirk Douglas as Detective Jim McLeod
 Eleanor Parker as Mary McLeod
 William Bendix as Detective Lou Brody
 Cathy O'Donnell as Susan Carmichael
 George Macready as Dr. Karl Schneider
 Horace McMahon as Lt. Monaghan
 Gladys George as Miss Hatch
 Joseph Wiseman as Charley Gennini, a burglar
 Lee Grant as Shoplifter
 Gerald Mohr as Tami Giacoppetti

 Frank Faylen as Detective Gallagher
 Craig Hill as Arthur Kindred
 Michael Strong as Lewis Abbott
 Luis Van Rooten as Joe Feinson
 Bert Freed as Detective Dakis
 Warner Anderson as Endicott Sims, lawyer
 Grandon Rhodes as Detective O'Brien
 William "Bill" Phillips as Detective Pat Callahan
 Russell Evans as Patrolman Steve Barnes
 Burt Mustin as Willy the Janitor (uncredited)

Production
Paramount bought film rights in 1949 for $285,000, plus a percentage of the profits. Alan Ladd was the first star linked to the project.

The film version omits details from the play pertaining to the criminal underworld and the dangers of a police state.

During production, the film had some trouble with the Production Code Authority. Plotlines involving the killing of police officers or references to abortion were not permitted by Production Code. Joseph Breen suggested that explicit references to abortion would be altered to "baby farming". However, when the film was released, film critics still interpreted Dr. Schneider as an illicit abortionist. Breen and William Wyler suggested to the MPAA Production Code Committee that the code be amended to allow the killing of police officers if it was absolutely necessary for the plot. They agreed, and the code was amended, lifting the previous ban on cop-killing. Another noteworthy factor regarding the passing of this film is that, at the time that this film was made, the Production Code Administration's primary concern about cop killing was in regards to "Gangster" films, in that there is conflict between the criminal and the police officer. The killing was not premeditated, which again, helped allow the Production Code Administration to pass the film.

Joseph Wiseman later played the titular role in Dr. No (1962), the first James Bond film starring Sean Connery. Gerald Mohr portrayed Doc Holliday in the television series Maverick in the 1957 episode titled "The Quick and the Dead" starring James Garner and Marie Windsor.

Reception

Critical response
When the film was released, Bosley Crowther, film critic for The New York Times, lauded the film and the casting, writing, "Sidney Kingsley's play, Detective Story, has been made into a brisk, absorbing film by Producer-Director William Wyler, with the help of a fine, responsive cast. Long on graphic demonstration of the sort of raffish traffic that flows through a squad-room of plainclothes detectives in a New York police station-house and considerably short on penetration into the lives of anyone on display... In the performance of this business, every member of the cast rates a hand, with the possible exception of Eleanor Parker as the hero's wife, and she is really not to blame. Kirk Douglas is so forceful and aggressive as the detective with a kink in his brain that the sweet and conventional distractions of Miss Parker as his wife appear quite tame. In the role of the mate of such a tiger—and of a woman who has had the troubled past that is harshly revealed in this picture—Mr. Wyler might have cast a sharper dame."

Critic James Steffen appreciated the direction of the film and the cinematography of Lee Garmes, writing "While Detective Story remains essentially a filmed play, Wyler manages to use the inherent constraints of such an approach as an artistic advantage. The confined set of the police precinct is not simply a space where various characters observe each other and interact; it also contributes to the underlying thematic thrust and ultimately to the film's emotional power. The staging of the individual scenes, which often plays on foreground-background relationships, is also augmented by Lee Garmes’ deep focus photography. (Wyler, of course, used deep focus photography extensively in the films he shot with Gregg Toland.)"

Time felt the film adaptation was better than the original play.

Awards and nominations

Distribution

Video and DVD
In a DVD review of the film, technology critic Gary W. Tooze, wrote, "Absolutely stunning image. One of the best I have seen for a black and white film this year. Superb sharpness, shadow details and contrast. Standard Paramount bare bones release with no extras and a price tag for the frugal minded. The image and price make it a must own for Noir fans and everyone else too. Wyler direction sends the film to upper tier to join the DVD."

Radio adaptation 
On April 26, 1954, Detective Story was presented on Lux Radio Theatre on NBC. Douglas and Parker starred in the adaptation.

References

External links
 
 
 
 
 
 

1951 films
1951 crime drama films
American crime drama films
American black-and-white films
Edgar Award-winning works
1950s English-language films
Fictional portrayals of the New York City Police Department
Films about the New York City Police Department
Film noir
Films directed by William Wyler
Films set in New York City
American films based on plays
American police films
Paramount Pictures films
1950s American films